The Venezuela Billie Jean King Cup team represents Venezuela in the Billie Jean King Cup tennis competition and are governed by the Federación Venezolana de Tenis. Venezuela will compete in Americas Zone Group I in 2012.

History
Venezuela competed in its first Fed Cup in 1984.  Their best result was reaching the World Group Play-offs in 1998 and 2001.

Players

See also
Fed Cup
Venezuela Davis Cup team

External links

Billie Jean King Cup teams
Fed Cup
Fed Cup